De Afvallers (literal translation: The Slimmers) is a Dutch reality television series which first premiered on SBS 6. The series is a spin-off of the American reality television series The Biggest Loser and the SBS 6 weight-loss series Big Diet, which was canceled after two seasons due to low ratings.

Format
Over the course of three months, four families must lose as much weight as possible, with the winning family receiving a vacation to a distant destination (Brazil or South Africa). The show attempts to address not only weight problems, but also the psychological problems and life style changes. The participating families have a trainer to guide them through the process.

Seasons

Season 1
First aired 31 August 2005
 Daan (43) and Irma (37) Steenkamp with children Michael (14) and Nick (11). Coach Jessica Galle. Winner trip to Brazil.
 Frank (43) and Marianne (42) van den Broek with children Jeroen (18) and Alex (16). Coach: Mo Achahboun.
 Karel (50) and Bets (49) Huygens with children Barbara (25) and Berry (23). Coach: Imro Beuk.
 Herman (63) and Moraima (43) Neut with children Ailyne (22) and Swendy (18). Coach: Lenny Versteegden.

Season 2
First aired 8 March 2006
 Bert (48) and Grietje (45) Bakker with children Bert (23) and Akke (20). Coach: Yneke Vocking. Winner trip to Brazil.
 Pieter (44) and Anneloes (42) Kamoen with children Bo (17) and Nick (14). Coach: Imro Beuk.
 Sylvia Berkhout (44) with children Michael (25), Laura (23) and Suzanne (18). Coach: Mo Achahboun.

Season 3
First aired 13 September 2006
 Marco (38) and Suzy (37) van Boxtel with children Niels (9) and Narda (8). Coach: Yneke Vocking. Winner trip to South Africa.
 René (45) and Rikkie (44) de Wit with children Rénie (15) and Bart (14). Coach: Imro Beuk.
 Henri (41) and Margriet (36) with children Edward (13) and heal (11). Coach: Gianni Romme.
 Marja Mulder (50) with daughters Bianca (31), Diana (29) and Saskia (24). Coach: Barbara de Loor.

The van Boxtel family from Tilburg won the final. The children, Niels and Narda, will appear in the new movie ZOOP in South America.

Season 4
First aired 21 February 2007
This is a special version of the show, called De afvallers met Sterren (The Slimmers with Stars), featuring eight famous Dutch participants.

Season 5
First aired November 2007
Entitled De Afvallers XXL with 60 families from twelve provinces and coaches Yneke Vocking, Imro Beuk and Hein Vergeer.

Province North Holland
First aired 13 February 2007
 Winner of this show was the family Nijmeijers.
Province Gelderland
First aired 20 February 2007
 Winner of this show was the family Schagen
Province Utrecht
First aired 27 February 2007
 Winner of this show was the family Versteeg
Province North Brabant
First aired 5 March 2007
 Winner of this show was the family Sprangers
Province Limburg
First aired 12 March 2007
 Winner of this show was the family Jansen
Province Overijssel
First aired 19 March 2007
Winner of this show was the family Nijhof (from Goor)
Provinces Drenthe and Groningen
First aired 2 April 2007
Winner of this show was the family Bergsma
Province Zeeland
First aired 9 April 2007
Winner of this show was the family Sinke
Province South Holland
First aired 16 April 2007
Winner of this show was the family Krekt
Province Friesland
First aired 23 April 2007
Winner of this show was the family De Haan (from Ureterp)
Province Flevoland
First aired 30 April 2007
Winner of this show was the family Van der Swaan

Finale
First aired 7 May 2007
Grand prize winner: Family Nijmeijers
Father Tinus (47) initially weighed 1 November 2007 . He lost  and now weighs .
Mother Wilma (43) initially weighed 1 November 2007 . She lost  and now weighs .
Son Jeroen (15) initially weighed 1 November 2007 . He lost  and now weighs .
Son Robin (19) initially weighed 1 November 2007 . He lost  (a record for the program) and now weighs .

References

External links
 De Afvallers XXL at SBS 6

Netherlands
2005 Dutch television series debuts
2007 Dutch television series endings
NBC original programming
2000s Dutch television series
Dutch television series based on American television series
SBS6 original programming